|}

The Nas Na Riogh Novice Chase is a Grade B National Hunt novice handicap chase in Ireland. It is run at Naas in February, over a distance of 2 miles and 4 furlongs and during the race there are 13 fences to be jumped. 

The race was first run in 1981 as a Listed race restricted to novices, and was initially known as the Nas Na Ri Chase.  The race was renamed in 1996, and was upgraded to Grade 2 status in 2003. 

In 2015 the race was downgraded to a novice handicap.

Nas Na Ri/Nás na Ríogh is the Irish name for the town of Naas.

Records
Most successful jockey (4 wins):
 Davy Russell-  Thyne Again (2008), Roi Du Mee (2011), Rathlin (2012), Sweeney Tunes (2013) 

Most successful trainer (3 wins): 
 Willie Mullins–  Alexander Banquet (2000),	Kempes (2010), Mozoltov (2014) 
 Paul Nolan -  Joncol (2009), Sweeney Tunes (2013), Fitzhenry (2018)

Winners
 Amateur jockeys indicated by "Mr".

See also
 List of Irish National Hunt races

References
Racing Post

National Hunt races in Ireland
National Hunt chases
Naas Racecourse